Paremhat 3 - Coptic Calendar - Paremhat 5

The fourth day of the Coptic month of Paremhat, the seventh month of the Coptic year. In common years, this day corresponds to February 28, of the Julian Calendar, and March 13, of the Gregorian Calendar. This day falls in the Coptic Season of Shemu, the season of the Harvest.

Commemorations

Martyrs 

 The martyrdom of Saint Haboulyous the Prince

Other commemorations 

 The assembly of a Holy Council on the island of Bani-Omar

References 

Days of the Coptic calendar